Yutaka Kobayashi may refer to:

Name written 
Yutaka Kobayashi (politician), Japanese Diet councillor who represented Kanagawa At-large district
Name written 
Yutaka Kobayashi (actor), Japanese actor, known for Tenimyu and Kamen Rider Gaim
Yutaka Kobayashi (announcer), Japanese television announcer and meteorologist for Tokyo Broadcasting System Television
Yutaka Kobayashi (businessman), Japanese businessman who serves as representative director for TV Shizuoka
Other
Kobayashi Yutaka, fictional character in Megatokyo